Giuseppe Secchi (April 16, 1931 in Concorezzo – January 11, 2018 in Concorezzo) was an Italian professional footballer who made more than 400 appearances in the Italian leagues.

He played for four seasons (101 games, 36 goals) in the Serie A with Triestina, Udinese and Roma.

His most successful two years were spent with Udinese, when he scored 22 goals (coming as second best scorer of the Serie B) and 18 goals (second best scorer of the Serie A) respectively.

References

1931 births
2018 deaths
Italian footballers
Serie A players
Serie B players
Serie C players
Calcio Padova players
U.S. Triestina Calcio 1918 players
Udinese Calcio players
A.S. Roma players
Atalanta B.C. players
U.S. 1913 Seregno Calcio players

Association football forwards
A.S.D. Fanfulla players
Sportspeople from the Province of Monza e Brianza